Emily Mary Page Stone MB, BS (31 May 1865 – 18 December 1910), generally referred to as Mary or E. Mary Page Stone (sometimes hyphenated), was a medical doctor in the State of Victoria, Australia.

Mary was born in Mornington, Victoria, a daughter of shopkeeper John Stone, and his wife Laura Matilda, née Reed. She was educated there and in England, training as a teacher. She returned to Melbourne, where she taught at various private schools before enlisting with Melbourne University as a medical student in 1889.

She graduated after a brilliant scholastic career, being second in the top five for her graduating year. This should have entitled her to a position as resident medical officer at the Royal Melbourne Hospital, but was controversially disqualified because of her gender.

She practised for sixteen years, first at Windsor then Hawthorn, before dying as a result of a fall from her bicycle after colliding with a dray.

She was active in the cause of temperance, and an hon. secretary of the Victorian branch of the National Council of Women.

Cousins Constance Stone and Clara Stone were also medical doctors.

Recognition
An operating theatre at Queen Victoria Hospital, Melbourne, designed by I. G. Beaver, was dedicated to her memory by the National Council of Women.

Stone was inducted onto the Victorian Honour Roll of Women in 2007.

References 

Australian general practitioners
Australian women medical doctors
Australian medical doctors
Australian temperance activists
Road incident deaths in Victoria (Australia)
1865 births
1912 deaths
Cycling road incident deaths
University of Melbourne alumni
People from Mornington, Victoria
Medical doctors from Melbourne